Schönwald is a town in the district of Wunsiedel, in Bavaria, Germany. It is situated near the border with the Czech Republic, five km northwest of Selb and 18 km southeast of Hof.

Schönwald is famous for its porcelain industry.

References

Wunsiedel (district)